Linda Lawson ( Linda Gloria Spaziani;  January 14, 1936 – May 18, 2022) was an American actress and singer.

Biography
Her 50-year acting career began in 1955 with a short film for the U.S. government. On May 5, 1955, Lawson was dubbed "Miss Cue"
in reference to a series of nuclear tests conducted by the US military under "Operation Teapot," and publicized as "Operation Cue" in a short film distributed by the US Federal Civil Defense Administration.

She appeared in several television series, including Alfred Hitchcock Presents; The Alfred Hitchcock Hour; Maverick starring James Garner, as Clint Eastwood's "other woman" in the episode "Duel at Sundown"; James Michener's Adventures in Paradise, as recurring character "Renee" in six episodes; Don't Call Me Charlie!, in which she portrayed "Pat Perry" for eighteen episodes; Ben Casey, seen as "Laura Fremont" for nine episodes; Saved by the Bell: The New Class; M Squad; Overland Trail, and Wagon Train, co-starring with Raymond Massey as the princess of a lost Aztec settlement.

Lawson also appeared in two episodes of Bonanza, It Takes a Thief, ER; The Virginian, Mr. Lucky, Perry Mason, The Real McCoys, The Aquanauts, Sea Hunt; Tales of Wells Fargo, 77 Sunset Strip; Hawaiian Eye; Border Patrol, Colt .45,Peter Gunn, Mickey Spillane's Mike Hammer and The Tall Man among many others.

She also appeared in several movies, including Sometimes a Great Notion. She co-starred opposite Dennis Hopper in Night Tide (1961).

Personal life
She was married to film producer John Foreman. Amanda Foreman and Julie Foreman, both actresses, are their daughters. She died in Woodland Hills, Los Angeles on May 18, 2022, at the age of 86. Her death was announced 2 weeks later.

Music
In 1960, Lawson recorded Introducing Linda Lawson. The music was conducted and arranged by Marty Paich.

Tracks:
 Are You With Me (H. Levin, D. Robinson)
 Where Flamingos Fly (J. Kennedy, M. Spoliansky)
 But Beautiful (J. Burke, J. VanHeusen)
 Me And My Shadow (B. Rose, A. Jolson, D. Dreyer)
 You Don't Know What Love Is (Raye, DePaul)
 Easy To Love (Cole Porter)
 Meaning of the Blues (Bobby Troup, Leah Worth)
 Mood Indigo (D. Ellington, I. Mills, A. Bigard)
 Like Young (P. F. Webster, A. Previn)
 Hi-Lili, Hi-Lo (H. Deutsch, B. Kaper)
 Make The Man Love Me (D. Fields, A. Schwartz)
 Up Pops Love (R. Faith, C. Kehner)

Filmography

Film

Television

References

External links
 

1936 births
2022 deaths
American film actresses
American television actresses
American jazz singers
Singers from Michigan
Actresses from Michigan
Jazz musicians from Michigan
People from Ann Arbor, Michigan
21st-century American actresses